"Love Without Mercy" is a song written by Don Pfrimmer and Mike Reid. It was originally recorded by The Oak Ridge Boys for their 1987 album Heartbeat, and later by Reid on his album Twilight Town. The Oak Ridge Boys' version was the B-side of their 1988 single "True Heart".

It was later recorded by American country music singer Lee Roy Parnell. It was released in September 1992 as the third single from, and title track to, his 1992 album Love Without Mercy. The song spent 20 weeks on the Hot Country Songs charts, peaking at number eight in early 1993.

Rita Coolidge released a version on her 1998 album Thinkin' About You.

Music video
The music video was directed by John Lloyd Miller and premiered in September 1992.

Chart performance
"Love Without Mercy" debuted at number 68 on the U.S. Billboard Hot Country Singles & Tracks for the week of October 3, 1992.

References

1992 singles
The Oak Ridge Boys songs
Lee Roy Parnell songs
Mike Reid (singer) songs
Rita Coolidge songs
Songs written by Mike Reid (singer)
Song recordings produced by Barry Beckett
Song recordings produced by Scott Hendricks
Arista Nashville singles
Music videos directed by John Lloyd Miller
Songs written by Don Pfrimmer
1987 songs